V81 may refer to :
 the serial number of an Ariane 4 launch in 1995 that put the Telecom 2C and Insat 2C satellites into orbit
 SMS V81, a 1916 torpedo boat built by German AG Vulcan Stettin shipbuilding company